Ellison's Cave is a pit cave located in Walker County, on Pigeon Mountain in the Appalachian Plateaus of Northwest Georgia. It is the 12th deepest cave in the United States and features the deepest, unobstructed pit in the continental US named Fantastic Pit. The cave is over 12 miles long and extends 1063 feet vertically.

Pits

Ellison's features a number of underground vertical pitches including the two deepest pits in the contiguous United States: Fantastic (586 feet) and Incredible (440 feet). These two pits lie on opposite sides of the cave. Nearby and parallel to Fantastic are Smokey I (500 feet), Smokey II (262 feet), and other deep pitches.

Geology

Ellison's is a solution cave in the Ridge and Valley geologic region of northwest Georgia and lies within a bedrock fault in Pigeon Mountain. During the Ordovician Period, tectonic subduction responsible for forming the Appalachians left a number of seismically active fault lines stretching from northern Alabama to eastern Tennessee. Continued orogeny created a large fault zone in the bedrock throughout the southern Appalachians and northern Georgia. This fracturing along with the proliferation of gypsum and limestone contributes to the exceptional depth of Ellison's.

Incidents

 March 10, 1999 - A caver climbing the Incredible pit became tangled in multiple ropes and was stranded 140 feet off the cave floor underneath water falling into the pit. The incident resulted in fatality due to hypothermia.
 February 12, 2011 - Two University of Florida students died of hypothermia after becoming stuck on rope near a waterfall close to the bottom of 125 ft Warm-up pit. It was reported that the students were underexperienced and underprepared for the cave.
 May 26, 2013 - A caver was rescued and hospitalized after falling 40 feet in the cave.  It took 21 hours to evacuate the caver, including hauling up Fantastic Pit.
 March 26, 2016 - A 22-year-old man suffering from exhaustion and cold was rescued from the bottom of Fantastic Pit after emerging from the lower part of the cave. After being hauled up both Fantastic and the Warm Up Pit, he was able to walk down the mountain on his own.

Visiting

The cave and surrounding area are managed by the Georgia Department of Natural Resources and are open year-round.

References

Caves of Georgia (U.S. state)
Landforms of Walker County, Georgia